Sōja is a city in Okayama Prefecture, Japan.

Soja may also refer to:

People
Edward Soja (1940–2015), American geographer and urban planner
Jean André Soja (born 1946), Malagasy politician
Soja Jovanović (1922–2002), Yugoslavian film and theater director

Other places
Sōja Station, a railway station in Sōja, Okayama

Plants
Soja, an alternate spelling of soya, as in soya bean
Soja, a synonym of the legume genus Glycine

Music
SOJA ("Soldiers of Jah Army"), a reggae band from Virginia, USA
SOJA (EP), a 2000 release by the band

Other uses
  Sōja or Sōsha, a Shinto term referring to a "combined shrine" where all of the kami in an area are worshipped together

See also

Sojas, a city in Zanjan Province, Iran
 
 Soia (disambiguation)
 Soya (disambiguation)
 Soy (disambiguation)
 Soi (disambiguation)
 SOJ (disambiguation)